Manuel Andújar Muñoz (1913 – 1994) was a Spanish novelist, playwright, poet and essayist.

Early life and education

The first years of his life were spent in La Carolina, Linares and Málaga.  At Malaga, he studied at the German College and later at the School of Commerce, studies which were interrupted by the illness poliomyelitis; he published his first articles in literary criticism.  In 1932 he arrived at Madrid, where he completed his studies in professional accountancy.  He transferred to Lérida and later, at the end of 1935, to Barcelona, places where he worked as an administrator.  He secretly served in the Communist Party; during the Civil War he worked as a journalist.  After spending time in the concentration camp of Saint-Cyprien (France), he came to Veracruz (Mexico) in the Sinaia and there remained until 1967, with brief stays in other countries of Hispanoamerica and a whole year (from 1956 to 1957) in Santiago de Chile.  In Mexico he began to work at an import business translating the correspondence into English and French; he also worked in publicity, founding together with José Ramón Arana the magazine The Spaniards, a meeting-place for expatriate Spanish writers and poets who came to fill the void left by the ephemeral publications The Wandering Spaniard of Jose Bergamín and Romance of the poet Juan Rejano.  Andújar then wrote his books of poetry, his first dramatic works, and his narrative trilogy The Days Before, about the period preceding the Civil War, with, as Rafael Conte has observed, a style inspired by Benito Peréz Galdós, but submitted to an artistic and stylistic purification.  He worked as a press correspondent and in a watch-making company, the which connected him with the world of radio and publicity.  In 1946 he was nominated director of promotions and publicity of the Juárez Book Company, and of the famous Mexican editorial The Economic Culture Fund, labours in which he remained for eleven years.

Career

In Mexico he achieved repute in his vocation as a writer by writing a work that repudiated violence ethically and historically.  He associated with a large number of journalists and writers.  He published various works in 1967 on return to Spain, where he combined his efforts as a writer with his work in Editorial Alliance.  He was nominated Favorite Son of Andalusia in 1985 and died in Madrid in 1994.  His file is currently found in the Documentary Archive of Themes and Authors in Jaén of the Provincial Delegation of Jaén.

Manuel Andújar wrote novels, stories (Narrations, 1989, which reunites his complete stories), poetry (The Correct Image, 1961;  Bell and Chain, 1965; Dates of A Return; Feelings and Desires, 1984), theatre (The First Final Judgement; The Anniversaries; The Stolen Dream, 1962) and the essay (Narratives of a Spanish Exile and Latin American Literature, 1974), etc., but his work was not edited in Spain until 1986, the year in which Alfaguara took the first step.  Upon returning from exile, and now in Jaén, where he left a large part of his work to the Jaén Documentary Archive of Themes and Authors of the Delegation.  In his work he emphasized fundamentally two narrative trilogies and various novels that integrate a lengthy narrative mosaic of the Spanish 20th century, that the author entitled Lares and Penates. He began with a first novel,  Fractured Crystal (1945), and followed with two trilogies: Eves and Histories of a History, that narrate, respectively, the occurrences prior to the Civil War through internal histories, and the war itself. His trilogy The Days Before tells of the prewar civil environment through three novels set in the country, the mines, and the sea.  It opens with The Plain (1947), the story of a family entrenched in La Mancha, in fact in a pueblo, “Las Encinas”, likely an imitation of the Spanish municipality Viso del Marqués.  The mother, Gabriela, defends the family after the father is murdered by the local overlords, until her youngest son relieves her.  When the situation seems to improve, the assassin of the mayor makes Benito abandon Las Encinas.  The alternation of paragraphs between first and third person enlivens the story and its slow tempo confers a notable lyricism.  That same Manchegan setting appears again in the stories grouped under the title, Of the Fertile Plain and the Pueblo.  The trilogy continues with The Conquered (1949), about the world of the miners, and finishes with The Destiny of Lazarus (1959), centered on the sea.  Another of his trilogies was Histories of a History (1973, censured version, and 1986, complete version).  He completed the novelistic cycle of Andújar with the novels The Voice and the Blood (1984) and Appointment of Ghosts (1984).  Among his most relevant essays one may count Catalan Literature in Exile and Andalusia and Hispanoamerica: Crucible of Cross-Breedings.  Among the stories and chronicle-tales we can cite Empty Spaces (1971), The Luminous Strip (1973), Secret Predictions, Parting With Anguish (1944) and Saint-Cyprien, Plague.  Concentration Camp (1942).  Other works of his are The Shadow of the Beam (1968), Everything is Foreseen and A Gentleman with a Saffron Beard (1992).

Body of work

1913 births
1994 deaths
Spanish male novelists
Spanish male dramatists and playwrights
Spanish essayists
20th-century Spanish novelists
20th-century Spanish poets
20th-century Spanish dramatists and playwrights
Spanish male poets
Male essayists
20th-century essayists
20th-century Spanish male writers